Foreign relations between Belgium and Mexico commenced in 1836, when Belgium—itself newly independent—recognized the independence of Mexico. In 1919, the Belgian Chamber of Commerce of Mexico was established. Both nations are members of the Organisation for Economic Co-operation and Development and the United Nations.

History 

In the 16th century, Belgian tradespeople traveled to what would become Mexico. In 1537, Belgians began Mexico's first brewery. Starting in the 1830s, Belgian engineers worked in Mexico to build the first Mexican railroad with Belgian materials; there were even plans for a Nueva Bélgica, a colony to be built in Chihuahua.

Diplomatic relations were started in 1825 when Mexico established consular relations with the Kingdom of the Netherlands. Belgium became independent in 1830, and in 1838, representatives were sent to Mexico. The first consulate-level representatives were sent to Mexico in 1842. In 1861, both nations signed a Treaty of Friendship thus formally establishing diplomatic relations.

In 1861, France, under Emperor Napoleon III, and at the invitation of Mexican conservatives and nobility, sent troops to invade Mexico and to help create the Second Mexican Empire. While the French were in Mexico (also known as the Second French intervention in Mexico), Maximilian I of Mexico and his wife, Charlotte of Belgium (known as Carlota of Mexico) succeeded the throne in 1864. During the Battle of Tacámbaro on 11 April 1865, 300 Belgian Legion soldiers fighting for the Mexican Empire fought against Mexican Republicans (those who fought for President Benito Juárez). Several dozen Belgian soldiers were killed during the battle.

When Emperor Maximilian I faced execution, Belgium instructed its representative, Hoorickx, to assist the Austrian ambassador's ultimately failed efforts to persuade the Mexicans to grant clemency. After the execution of Emperor Maximilian I in 1867, Belgium and Mexico would not establish diplomatic relations until 1879.

In 1890 Belgium invested US$1.2 million to open a silver and copper mine in Michoacán. In 1900 Baron Moncheur, the Belgian Minister in Mexico, wrote a study of the conditions and resources of southern Mexican states while "contributing in great measure to the development of the commercial relations between Belgium and Mexico." In 1903 the National Railroad of Mexico, in which the Mexican Government had a large financial interest, opened a standard gauge line. The turning of the previous narrow gauge railroad into a standard gauge railroad was accomplished with 25,000 tons of rails from Belgium. By 1913 the National Railroad of Mexico was lobbying the government of Victoriano Huerta not to grant any further rights to the Belgian syndicate competing against them. Again in 1926 Belgium was shipping 1,000 tons of steel rails for the railroad.

During World War II, Mexico closed its diplomatic legation in Brussels and moved its diplomatic staff to London where the Belgian government in exile was residing. In 1940 Belgian residents of Mexico supported Hubert Pierlot as Prime Minister of Belgium during the Nazi occupation. After the war, Mexico returned to having a resident diplomatic legation in Brussels and in 1954, both nations raised their diplomatic legations to embassies. That same year, Belgium opened its embassy in Mexico on June 5, 1954. In 1980, Mexican protesters peacefully occupied both the Belgian and Danish embassies to demand freedom for political prisoners and better living conditions for Mexicans.

In 2018, the Brussels' Flower Carpet featured cultural elements from the state of Guanajuato, Mexico. Including symbolism from the Chupícuaro, Otomí and Purépecha cultures.

High-level visits 

High-level visits from Belgium to Mexico

 King Baudouin of Belgium (1965)
 King (then Prince) Philippe of Belgium (1998, 2003, 2009, 2010)
 Prime Minister Jean-Luc Dehaene (1999)
 Prime Minister Guy Verhofstadt (2002)

High-level visits from Mexico to Belgium

 President Luis Echeverría Álvarez (1973)
 President Miguel de la Madrid Hurtado (1985)
 President Carlos Salinas de Gortari (1990, 1993)
 President Vicente Fox (2002)
 President Felipe Calderón (2007)
 President Enrique Peña Nieto (2015)

Belgians in Mexico 

 Francis Alÿs, artist known for interdisciplinary works of art, architecture, and social practices.
 Carlos Francisco de Croix, marqués de Croix of Lille was appointed as viceroy (1766–1771). He suppressed native Mexican rebellions in the north of Mexico and expelled the Jesuits on June 25, 1767.
 Carlota of Mexico, born Princess Charlotte of Belgium, daughter of King Leopold II of Belgium. She became empress consort at the birth of the Second Mexican Empire, as wife of Emperor Maximilian I of Mexico.
 Edgar Everaert founder of Club Deportivo Guadalajara, popularly known as Chivas
 Pedro de Gante, who was active from 1523 to 1572, devised a catechism in rebus form. He organized a craft industry and art education and built hospitals for the native Mexicans.
 Gustave Maryssael, an electrical engineer started SOFINA. In 1936 he was president of the Companía Mexicana the Luz y Fuerza Motriz and later director-general in 1962.
 Simon Pereyns of Antwerp is considered the founder of Mexican painting, and some of his painted screens are in the Mexico City Metropolitan Cathedral.
 Jan de Vos, historian who became guest-advisor to the Zapatista Army of National Liberation (EZLN) during the peace talks with the Mexican Government.
 Ronald Zollman, from 1994 to 2002, was music director of the National Autonomous University of Mexico Philharmonic Orchestra.

Bilateral agreements 
Both nations have signed several bilateral agreements such as a Treaty of Friendship, Navigation and Commerce (1861); Treaty of Trade and Shipping (1895); Extradition Treaty (1938); Agreement for Cultural Cooperation (1964); Agreement to Avoid Double Taxation and Prevent Tax Evasion in Taxes on Income (1992) and an Air Transportation Agreement (1999).

Transportation
There are direct flights between Brussels Airport and Cancún International Airport with TUI fly Belgium.

Trade 
In 1997, Mexico signed a Free Trade Agreement with the European Union (which includes Belgium). In 2018, two-way trade between both nations amounted to US$3.3 billion. Belgium's main exports to Mexico include: chemical based products; medicine and pharmaceutical products; and automobiles. Mexico's main exports to Belgium include: chemical based products, medical equipment, computers, automobiles, tractors and telephones. Belgian multinational companies such as Agfa-Gevaert, Janssen Pharmaceutica and Katoen Natie operate in Mexico. Belgian company Anheuser-Busch InBev owns a 50% share in Grupo Modelo, Mexico's leading brewer and owner of the global Corona brand.

Resident diplomatic missions 
 Belgium has an embassy in Mexico City.
 Mexico has an embassy in Brussels.

See also
 Foreign relations of Belgium
 Foreign relations of Mexico 
 Battle of Tacámbaro
 Belgian Mexicans

References 

 
Mexico
Bilateral relations of Mexico